is a Japanese corporation headquartered in Chiyoda, Tokyo and is engaged in the design, production and installation of jig-back and material ropeways, gondola lifts, funiculars, chairlifts, car parking systems, ramp elevators and amusement park rides.
The company also owns and operates resorts in Japan and Canada, including a 25% interest in  Whistler Blackcomb, the largest ski resort in North America and host of alpine and nordic skiing events during the 2010 Winter Olympics and Sun Peaks Resort.

Besides the headquarters in Tokyo, the company has a factory in Narashino, branches in Nagano, Osaka, Sapporo, offices in Fukuoka and service centers in Niigata and Takayama.

The company has been a licensee of Doppelmayr since 1977.

References

Engineering companies of Japan
Aerial lift manufacturers
Manufacturing companies based in Tokyo
Manufacturing companies established in 1953
Technology companies established in 1953
Japanese brands